List of military equipment used by Syrian opposition forces in the Syrian Civil War. This list does not include equipment used by the Islamic State of Iraq and the Levant and the Syrian Democratic Forces.

Sources
Large equipment like tanks and vehicles are generally captured from Syrian Army supplies, but small arms are likely a mixture of captured Syrian Army weapons, weapons imported by foreign combatants joining the opposition forces, or other sources. These include funding by private donors (notably from the Gulf region) and equipment supplied by friendly nations.

The U.S. supplied a considerable amount of weapons and ammunition, of both American and Soviet-type from Eastern Europe, to Syrian rebel groups under operation Timber Sycamore. For example, Jane's Defence Weekly reported that in December 2015 the U.S. shipped 994 tonnes of weapons and ammunition (including packaging and container weight).

Small arms

Grenades, grenade launchers and explosives

Anti-tank weapons

Anti-aircraft weapons

Artillery and Mortars

Tanks and armoured vehicles

See also 
 List of military equipment of Hezbollah
 List of military equipment of Islamic State
 List of military equipment used by Syrian Democratic Forces

References

Military equipment of Syria
Military equipment
Syria